is a Japanese amateur astronomer and prolific discoverer of minor planets. He was born in Hokkaidō, Japan and is a member of the Astronomical Society of Japan as well as of the Oriental Astronomical Association.

Through publications and the direction of junior associates, this asteroid hunter has been responsible for the discovery of nearly 700 asteroids. He is the author or the co-author of the Japanese publications Asteroid Hunter (小惑星ハンター), Celestial Body Photography Manual (天体写真マニュアル), The Celestial Sky of Our Dreams (僕らの夢の星空), as well as others. He also is a frequent contributor to the Japanese periodical Monthly Astronomical Guide (月刊天文ガイド).

The minor planet 4155 Watanabe has been named in his honor.

Discoveries

Names of some asteroids 

 Mamiya (間宮, 12127) – Named after the famous Edo-period detective, Mamiya Rinzō.
 Tentaikojo (天体工場, 12713) – Named after the museum of that name in Sapporo.

List of discovered asteroids 

Kazuro Watanabe is credited by the Minor Planet Center with the discovery of 671 minor planets made between 1987 and 2000.

Some of his discoveries include (in alphabetical order) the minor planets 4263 Abashiri (Florian asteroid), 4585 Ainonai, 46610 Bésixdouze, 5331 Erimomisaki, 3915 Fukushima, 5474 Gingasen (Vestian binary), 9971 Ishihara, 11949 Kagayayutaka, 5481 Kiuchi, 6498 Ko (slow rotator), 6500 Kodaira (a Mars-crosser), 6980 Kyusakamoto (Koronian asteroid), 4607 Seilandfarm (rare-type binary), 5357 Sekiguchi and 5692 Shirao.

References 
 

1955 births
Discoverers of asteroids

20th-century Japanese astronomers
Living people